Floyd W. Volker (June 21, 1921 – January 5, 1995) was an American basketball player.  He played professionally in the National Basketball League (NBL), the National Professional Basketball League (NPBL), and in the National Basketball Association (NBA) in the early days of professional basketball.

Volker, a 6'4 forward from Casper High School in Casper, Wyoming, went on to play collegiately at the University of Wyoming.  He was a starting forward on the Cowboys' 1943 national championship team as a junior.  After a pause in his career to serve in the US military during World War II, Volker returned to campus for his senior year in 1946–47.

After his college playing days, Volker signed with the Oshkosh All-Stars of the NBL in 1947.  In 1949, when the NBL and the Basketball Association of America merged to form the NBA, the All-Stars were disbanded and Volker was assigned to the Indianapolis Olympians for the inaugural season of the NBA.  During the season, his rights were sold to the Denver Nuggets.  He averaged 7.4 points and 2.1 assists in his lone NBA season.  He then played one season in the short-lived NPBL in 1950–51 until the demise of that league at the end of the season.

Volker died in January 1995, aged 73.

References

1921 births
1995 deaths
American men's basketball players
Basketball players from Wyoming
Centers (basketball)
Denver Nuggets (1948–1950) players
Indianapolis Olympians players
Oshkosh All-Stars players
Power forwards (basketball)
Sportspeople from Casper, Wyoming
Undrafted National Basketball Association players
Wyoming Cowboys basketball players
American military personnel of World War II